Margaret Ann Jones  (born 4 November 1953) is a Welsh Labour Co-operative politician. Born in Rhyl, Denbighshire, Jones was the Member of the Senedd (MS) for Vale of Clwyd from 1999 until she retired in 2021. From 11 May 2016 until her retirement, she was the Deputy Presiding Officer for the Senedd.

Family 
Margaret Ann Jones was born to Charles Jones and Helen Jones (née Sadler) in Rhyl. She was educated at Rhyl Grammar School and Rhyl High School. She married Adrian Jones in 1973 and has 1 son and 1 daughter.

Career 
Ann worked as an Emergency Call Officer and a number of management positions in the control room of Flintshire Fire Brigade and Clwyd Fire Brigade between 1970 and 1979 and as a Fire Control Officer with Merseyside Fire Brigade from 1991 to 1999.

Ann served as a national officer in the Fire Brigades Union for a number of years and has sat on the executive boards of the Welsh Labour Party and the Wales TUC. She is a member of UNISON and remains a 'out of trade' member of the FBU.

Political career 
Ann Jones was a member of Rhyl Town Council from 1991 to 1999, and Mayor of Rhyl in 1996–7. She was a councillor on Denbighshire County Council from 1995 to 1999 and agent for Chris Ruane MP at the 1997 General Election. She is a member of the Christian Socialist Movement.

She was elected to the Senedd for the Vale of Clwyd in 1999, holding the seat at every Assembly Election since then, although the seat is very marginal.

Ann has chaired several Assembly Committees including the Children, Young People and Education Committee, the All Party Group on Deaf Issues and was chair of the National Assembly Labour Group from 2011 to 2016. From 2011–2013, Jones chaired the Communities, Equalities and Local Government Committee.

Her political interests include education, tourism, community safety, regeneration, social policy and the Emergency Services. She is a fan of the Rhyl Town Football Club and she remains a Lillywhites season ticket holder.

In 2016 she was elected Deputy Presiding Officer of the National Assembly, defeating Labour Newport East AM, John Griffiths 30-29.

Jones was appointed Officer of the Order of the British Empire (OBE) in the 2021 New Year Honours for parliamentary and public service in Wales.

Fire Safety Measure 
In 2007, Ann Jones won a ballot and had the opportunity to introduce the first Senedd Measure from a backbench member. Ann Jones announced her intention to introduce legislation to make it mandatory to install a fire suppression system in  new homes. The process of transferring the law-making powers to the Senedd began in 2007 and in 2010 a Legislative Competence Order was made allowing the Senedd to legislate.  The Domestic Fire Safety (Wales) Measure 2011 was debated in the Senedd in 2010 and 2011 before receiving Royal assent on 7 April 2011.

In 2019 Ann Jones donated a collection of papers related to the legislation to the National Library of Wales.

Elections

Elections in the 2010s

Elections in the 2000s

Elections in the 1990s

References

External links
 
Welsh Labour Party Website
Website of the Welsh Assembly Government

Offices held

1953 births
Living people
Welsh Labour members of the Senedd
Labour Co-operative members of the Senedd
Wales AMs 1999–2003
Wales AMs 2003–2007
Wales AMs 2007–2011
Wales AMs 2011–2016
Welsh Labour councillors
People from Rhyl
Female members of the Senedd
20th-century British women politicians
Welsh trade unionists
Officers of the Order of the British Empire
Women councillors in Wales